Entocolax is a genus of sea snails, marine gastropod mollusks in the family Eulimidae.

Species
Species within this genus include:
 Entocolax chiridotae Scarlato, 1951
 Entocolax ludwigii Voigt, 1888
 Entocolax rimskykorsakovi Ivanov, 1945
 Entocolax schiemenzi Voigt, 1901
 Entocolax schwanitschi Heding in Heding & Mandahl-Barth, 1938
 Entocolax trochodotae Heding, 1934

Species brought into synonymy
 Entocolax ludwigi Voigt, 1888: synonym of Entocolax ludwigii Voigt, 1888

References

External links
To World Register of Marine Species

Eulimidae
Gastropod genera